A fair (archaic: faire or fayre) is a gathering of people for a variety of entertainment or commercial activities. Fairs are typically temporary with scheduled times lasting from an afternoon to several weeks.

Types

Variations of fairs include:
 Art fairs, including art exhibitions and arts festivals
 County fair (USA) or county show (UK), a public agricultural show exhibiting the equipment, animals, sports and recreation associated with agriculture and animal husbandry.
 Festival, an event ordinarily coordinated with a theme e.g. music, art, season, tradition, history, ethnicity, religion, or a national holiday.
 Health fair, an event designed for outreach to provide basic preventive medicine and medical screening
 Historical reenactments, including Renaissance fairs and Dickens fairs
 Horse fair, an event where people buy and sell horses.
 Job fair, event in which employers, recruiters, and schools give information to potential employees.
 Regional or state fair, an annual competitive and recreational gathering. Including exhibits or competitors that have won in their categories at the local fairs.
 Science fair, a competitive event for entries employ the scientific method to test a hypothesis.
 A town/city's street fair or market, including charter fairs, celebrates character of a neighborhood and local merchants.
 Temple fair or miaohui, yearly fair held in temples of various religions
 Trade fair, an exhibition organized so that companies in a specific industry can showcase and demonstrate their latest products and services, study activities of rivals, and examine recent market trends and opportunities.
 Traveling funfair or carnival, an amusement show made up of amusement rides, food vending stalls, merchandise vending stalls, games of "chance and skill", thrill acts and (now less commonly) animal acts.
 Village fair or fête, an elaborate periodic festival, party or celebration. Held by the locals to original to celebrate a good harvests or religious gatherings.
 World's fair, an international exhibition designed to showcase achievements of nations

History

The Roman fairs were holidays on which work and business such as law courts were suspended. In the Roman provinces of Judea and Syria Palaestina, Jewish rabbis prohibited Jews from participating in fairs in certain towns because the religious nature of the fairs contravened the prescribed practice of Judaism.

In the Middle Ages, many fairs developed as temporary markets and were especially important for long-distance and international trade, as wholesale traders travelled, sometimes for many days, to fairs where they could be sure to meet those they needed to buy from or sell to. The most famous were the Champagne fairs in northern France, which were spread over six towns for a total period of about six weeks, drawing goods and customers from much of Europe.  The Frankfurt Book Fair in Germany, still the largest trade fair for the publishing industry, began in the 12th century as a fair for manuscript books. 

Fairs were usually tied to special Christian feast days, such as the Saint's day of the local church. Stagshaw in England, is documented to have held annual fairs as early as 1293 consisting of the sales of animals. Along with the main fair held on 4 July, the city also hosted smaller fairs throughout the year where specific types of animals were sold, such as one for horses, one for lambs, and one for ewes.

The Kumbh Mela, held every twelve years, at Allahabad, Haridwar, Nashik, and Ujjain is one of the largest fairs in India, where more than 60 million people gathered in January 2001, making it the largest gathering anywhere in the world. Kumbha means a pitcher and Mela means fair in Sanskrit.

In the United States, fairs draw in as many as 150 million people each summer. Children's competitions at an American fair range from breeding small animals to robotics, whilst the organization 4-H has become a traditional association.

Sirsi Fair

The Sirsi Marikamba Devi Fair of the deity is held every alternate year in the month of March and taken through the city Sirsi, Karnataka. It is attended by a very large number of devotees. It is also most famous and biggest fair (Jaatre) of the India. Devotees from all around the state participate in this enormous event indulging themselves in the procession. Amusements for children, circuses, variety of shops, dramas and plays and many such things are set up for the people. It depicts the story of the goddess killing Mahishasura.

Legacy

Legal implications

Fairs attracted great numbers of people and they often resulted in public order issues and sometimes riots. The holding of fairs was, therefore, granted by royal charter. Initially they were only allowed in towns and places where order could be maintained due to the presence of a bishop, sheriff or governor. Later various benefits were granted to specific fairs, such as the granting of a holiday status to a fair or protections against arrest for specific laws for the duration of the fair. Officials were authorised to mete out justice to those who attended their fair; this led to even the smallest fair having a court to adjudicate on offences and disputes arising within the fairground. These courts were called a pye powder court (from Old French pieds pouldres, literally "dusty feet", meaning an itinerant trader, from Medieval Latin pedes pulverosi).

In art and language
The chaotic nature of the Stagshaw Bank Fair with masses of people and animals and stalls inspired the Newcastle colloquialism "like a Stagey Bank Fair" to describe a general mess.

The American county fair is featured in E. B. White's Charlotte's Web.

See also
 Art exhibition
 China fairing
 Lists of festivals

References

Further reading